Zoe Klusáková-Svobodová (4 December 1925 – 12 December 2022) was a Czech economist, academic, writer and translator. She was the daughter of Ludvík Svoboda, the President of Czechoslovakia from 1968 to 1975, and the widow of Czechoslovak diplomat, .

Biography
Klusáková-Svobodová was born in the city of Uzhhorod, Czechoslovakia (present-day Ukraine), on 4 December 1925. She was the youngest of two children, including her older brother, Miroslav. Her father, Ludvík Svoboda, was a general who would later become President of Czechoslovakia during the Communist era from 1968 to 1975. Her mother,  (née Stratilová), became the First Lady of Czechoslovakia.

Her father, General Ludvík Svoboda, went into exile during the Occupation of Czechoslovakia (1938–1945) by Nazi Germany and the outbreak of World War II, while Zoe Klusáková-Svobodová remained in occupied Czechoslovakia with her mother and brother. The entire family joined the Czechoslovak resistance to Nazi occupation, specifically aiding Czechoslovak and foreign paratroopers who landed near Dřínov. However, the family and the larger resistance cell were discovered by the Gestapo, forcing Klusáková-Svobodová to flee into hiding in the Bohemian-Moravian Highlands of southern Moravia from 1941 until the end of occupation in 1945. She and her mother first lived in hiding in the village of Hroznatín before moving to Džbánice for the remainder of the war. Her brother, Miroslav, was captured by the Nazis and died in the Mauthausen concentration camp in Austria.

Klusáková-Svobodová accounts of World War II and her involvement with the Czech resistance are archived in the Memory of Nations, an oral history initiative created by Post Bellum, a Czech nonprofit.  

Klusáková-Svobodová became an economist and a notable Czech-Russian translator. She taught at the Faculty of Law at Charles University in Prague. She also devoted considerable effort to preserving the legacy of her parents, Ludvík Svoboda and Irena Svobodová, including as honorary chairwoman of the Ludvík Svoboda Society.

Her daughter, Czech historian , died in 2020.

Awards and recognitions
  (2009) - Awarded by the Ministry of Defence.

References

1925 births
2022 deaths
Czech academics
20th-century Czech economists
21st-century Czech economists
Czech women economists
Czech translators
Czech resistance members
Academic staff of Charles University
Academic staff of the Prague University of Economics and Business
Czech Technical University in Prague alumni
People from Uzhhorod